Apostolove is a city in Kryvyi Rih Raion, Dnipropetrovsk Oblast (province) of Ukraine. It hosts the administration of Apostolove urban hromada, one of the hromadas of Ukraine. Population:  In 2001, the population was 16,439.

Until the raion was abolished on 18 July 2020, Apostolove was the administrative center of Apostolove Raion. After that date the town became part of Kryvyi Rih Raion.

Gallery

References

External links

 The murder of the Jews of Apostolove during World War II, at Yad Vashem website.

Cities in Dnipropetrovsk Oblast
Cities of district significance in Ukraine
Populated places established in the Russian Empire
Khersonsky Uyezd
Holocaust locations in Ukraine